An army corps general or corps general is a rank held by a General officer who commands an army corps. The rank originates from the French (Revolutionary) System, and is used by a number of countries. Normally, the rank is above the divisional general and below the army general, so it usually corresponds to the lieutenant general. However, in some countries such as Spain, Brazil, and Peru, the rank of army corps general is not used, in Spain the rank of army corps general is replaced by the rank of lieutenant general, while in some countries such as Brazil and Peru, the rank of army general is immediately above that of divisional general.

Algeria
Its rank badge shows three stars. The first officer to be promoted to the rank was general Mohamed Lamari, chief of staff of the ANP (1993-2004). In 2006 three officers were promoted to the rank - Ahmed Gaid Salah, chief of staff of the ANP, Bennabes Ghzeiel, military advisor to president Abdelaziz Bouteflika and former head of the gendarmerie, and Toufik Mediene, head of the Département du Renseignement et de la Sécurité. After Ghezeiel's death in July 2014, only Toufik and Gaid Salah were the only living holders of the rank. Since July 2015, they have been joined by general Ahmed Bousteila, commander of the Gendarmerie nationale, and general Benali Benali, commander of the Garde républicaine.

Czechoslovakia 
In the Czechoslovak Army, the rank of a corps general existed between 1947 and 1953. It was replaced by the colonel general rank under Soviet Army influence in 1953.

Cuba
The Cuban Revolutionary Armed Forces rank of  operates similarly to that in France and Algeria.

France
It is the third of four general ranks.

The rank insignia is four silver stars arranged in a diamond pattern.

However, Général under the ancient regime and the Général en chef under the imperial regime correspond to the army corps general, but are equivalent to general.

Italy

Army corps general's insignia

References

Military ranks of France
Military ranks of Algeria
Military ranks of Italy